Prior to the deportation of individuals of Jewish background to the concentration camps there were at least 2,173 Jews in Norway. Between 28 and 34 of those deported survived their continued imprisonment (following their deportation). The Norwegian police and German authorities kept records of these victims, and so, researchers were able to compile information about the deportees.

Before deportation
The deportation followed a series of steps to discriminate, persecute, and disenfranchise Jews in Norway. Jewish individuals were at first arrested, Jewish property was confiscated, Jews were ordered to report to local police stations and have their identification cards stamped with a "J" and fill in a lengthy form about their profession, holdings, and family. Based on the lists the police compiled, most Jewish adult men were arrested and detained in October 1942, and by November 26, women and children were also arrested for deportation. This is the only time in Norwegian history that Norwegian police had been ordered to arrest children.

The deportation from Norway to concentration camps followed a planned staging of events involving both Norwegian police authorities and German Gestapo, Sicherheitsdienst, and SS staff, though the front for the campaign was through Statspolitiet under the command of Karl Marthinsen:

 As of part of an overall effort to register and disenfranchise Jews from Norwegian economic and political life, some individuals were arrested, detained and deported immediately for various reasons. Some were citizens of countries not under German control or with puppet regimes (e.g., France and Romania); others were arrested as political prisoners early in the process, and treated individually.
 Smaller groups were typically transported with the transport , which was used for regular troop and prisoner transports between Oslo and Århus in Denmark.

Women and children were arrested on or just before November 26 with the goal of deporting them the same day.

The arrests were conducted by Norwegian policemen and lensmenn—not by Germans—according to Baard Herman Borge (a researcher).

After arrival at the pier in Oslo
 Under the command of Knut Rød, women and children in Oslo and Aker were joined with male members of the family at the pier at Akershuskaia where they were forcibly boarded on the SS Donau.
 On the same day, the Monte Rosa also left Akershuskaia with a smaller number of Jewish prisoners, primarily from Grini
 However, delays in transit from camps outside of Oslo caused the Donau to leave several intended deportees in Norway for a later departure. These were imprisoned at the Bredtveit concentration camp, where they were subjected to mistreatment and neglect. The transport ship Gotenland left in February with remaining prisoners.

Deportation
The deportation schedule for the major transports was:

Most of those deported were Norwegian citizens. Some were stateless refugees, and a few were citizens of other countries.

In addition to those Jews from Norway which were killed by the Nazis in death camps (Vernichtungslager), at least 22 more Jews died in Norway as a result of murder, extrajudicial executions and suicide.

Age distribution of Jews deported from Norway

Distribution of deportees by county arrested and transport

Jewish individuals who were deported included those with Norwegian citizenship, foreign citizens, and stateless refugees that were arrested and deported. The site where they were arrested was not always their place of residence; many had relocated to rural areas to avoid detection. The majority of those deported were immediately murdered in the gas chambers at Auschwitz; some were put to slave labor but perished soon after. A very small number ultimately survived.

Jews who died in prison camp
Cissi Klein
Ruth Maier
Moritz Rabinowitz

Liberation and return

Thousands of Norwegians were deported to camps in Germany and German-occupied territories during World War II. Most of those who survived were rescued by the White Buses campaign undertaken by the Norwegian government in exile, the Swedish government, the Danish government, with the Swedish Red Cross implementing the rescue with its offices. This followed intensive efforts by Norwegian and other Scandinavians to track and maintain contact with Norwegian citizens in camps. By comparison, there was no organized effort to maintain contact with and establish the fate of Jews who had been deported from Norway.

34 of the deportees survived the war. At least 21 of them returned to Norway soon after the war. The survivors were liberated from the following camps:

Auschwitz (at least three survivors)

Bergen Belsen (at least three survivors)
Buchenwald: at least five survivors. Having survived a death march from Auschwitz to Buchenwald, Leo Eitinger, Pelle Hirsch, Assor Hirsch, Julius Paltiel, and Samuel Steinmann  were liberated there on April 11. On March 1, fellow Norwegian but non-Jewish students had been sent by train from Buchenwald to Neuengamme as part of the White Buses operation, but these five were not allowed to leave on account of being Jewish. Following the liberation, the five had to find their own way home with the help of American and Danish individuals and officials. They arrived by boat in Oslo. Authorities were unable to provide them with any help, not even housing, and they relied on friends to get situated again.
Mauthausen—at least two survivors.
Ravensbruck—at least one survivor.
Sachsenhausen—at least four  survivors including Moritz Nachtstern who was kept in Block 19 at Sachsenhausen as part of Nazi Germany's efforts to counterfeit Allied currency. He found his own way home after liberation.
Theresienstadt: —at least one survivor.

2015 saw the death of the last remaining survivor of those deported from Norway—Samuel Steinmann.

Aided by the organization behind the White Buses
Four Norwegian Jews were rescued by the White Buses. At least one prisoner at the Dachau concentration camp was denied—by an SS-soldier—leaving with the White Buses, because the prisoner allegedly was not considered a Norwegian since he was a Jew.

Reactions
In trials in 1946 and 1948 regarding Knut Rød's role in the deportations, he was found not guilty. An Aftenposten article in 2014 said that the not guilty verdict has been called "the point of absolute zero in Norway's judicial history".

Legacy
Individual deportees have been commemorated with stolpersteine on a number of sidewalks in Oslo.

Notable survivors
Otto Eisler
Leo Eitinger
Berthold Epstein
Julius Paltiel
Samuel Steinmann (lecturing witness of the Holocaust and last surviving deportee from Norway during World War II; burial (in 2015) attended by the king and the prime minister of Norway)

See also
Antisemitism in Norway
Racial segregation in Norway
List of Jewish deportees from Norway during World War II

Footnotes

References

Sources

External links
Fangeskipet «Donaus» siste reis
Kart - Holocaust i Norge [Map - Holocaust in Norway]

Survivors:
Kai Feinberg
Pavel Fraenkl
Sjelden og sterk
Hans Levold (a.k.a. Hans Lustig), Wikipedia in Norwegian Bokmål
Herman Sachnowitz, Wikipedia in Norwegian Bokmål
Samuel Steinmann, Wikipedia in Norwegian Bokmål
30-årsjubileum. Forhold og episoder i okkupasjonsårene. (mentions details re. Josef Berg)
Tekst nr. 11 [Text no. 11] (Testimony by Moritz Kahan)
Eugen Keil, den jødiske urmakeren på Hønefoss
Fritz Georg Hans Ružička 
Sigurd Syversen  (details re. Leif Wolfberg)

Deceased in camps:
Norske Frank ble drept i grusomt raseeksperiment -Den 17 år gamle norske jøden Frank Sachnowitz fra Larvik forsvant i de tyske utryddelsesleirene under krigen. Lenge var skjebnen hans et mysterium. Først 70 år etter ble den forferdelige sannheten kjent. [Norwegian Frank was killed in a gruesome racial experiment - The 17-year-old Norwegian Jew, Frank Sachnowitz from Larvik, disappeared in the German extermination camps during the war. His fate was a mystery. 70 years later the awful truth became known.]
(About Kathe Lasnik and Benzel Braude:) 
(About Max Mankowitz:) Det siste vitnet

Photos
Stolpersteine in Oslo

Literature

Jewish Norwegian history
Deportees